The Erste  (literally First-Danube-Steamboat-Shipping Company) or DDSG was a shipping company founded in 1829 by the Austrian government for transporting passengers and cargo on the Danube.

History
The company built its first steamship building factory the so-called "Óbuda Shipyard" on the Hajógyári Island in Kingdom of Hungary in 1835, which was the first industrial scale steamship building company in the Habsburg Empire.

In 1880, the DDSG was the world's largest river shipping company with more than 200 steamboat ships and about 1000 cargo tubs.

During Nazi rule, the DDSG was involved in transporting Austrian Jews after Kristallnacht, when the Jews were pressured to emigrate elsewhere. Beginning in 1938, the DDSG transported Jews who were on so-called "B-immigration transports". The DDSG was also involved in taking excessive amounts of money and property from Jews in order to transport them. The SS worked with the DDSG in making the exit permits for Jews easier to obtain, since, at this point, the Nazis apparently just wanted them to leave the country. Although the Gestapo had leverage over the DDSG, the DDSG was a group that operated on its own will, in order to profit from forced Jewish emigration.

In 1991 the company was split into a passenger transportation enterprise and a cargo transport company. The company was sold to a private owner in 1993. Today the DDSG exists in the form of the two private companies DDSG-Blue Danube Schiffahrt GmbH (passenger transport) and the DDSG-Cargo GmbH.

Since the German spelling reform of 1996, "Schifffahrt" is written with three "f"s; however, since the name belongs to a company that existed before the spelling reform, the old form of the name is used when referring to the company.

The name of the company is well known in German-speaking countries as a starter to humorously construct even longer compound words.  is such a word, which potentially might even have been used, but probably never actually was. It means a "DDSG captain's hat".

See also
 , a notoriously long word, of similar origins.
Steamboats on the Danube

References

External links
 DDSG-Cargo GmbH
 DDSG-Blue Danube Schifffahrt GmbH
 

Shipping companies of Austria
Danube
The Holocaust in Austria
1829 establishments in the Austrian Empire
Companies established in 1829
River cruise companies
Companies based in Vienna